The 1955 NC State Wolfpack football team represented North Carolina State University during the 1955 college football season. The Wolfpack were led by second-year head coach Earle Edwards and played their home games at Riddick Stadium in Raleigh, North Carolina. They competed as members of the Atlantic Coast Conference, finishing winless in conference play for the third consecutive year. The Wolfpack's tie against Wake Forest was the school's first non-loss against an ACC opponent.

Schedule

References

NC State
NC State Wolfpack football seasons
NC State Wolfpack football